The 1980 NCAA Division II football season, part of college football in the United States organized by the National Collegiate Athletic Association at the Division II level, began in August 1980, and concluded with the NCAA Division II Football Championship in December 1980 at University Stadium in Albuquerque, NM. During the game's two-year stretch in New Mexico, it was referred to as the Zia Bowl.

Cal Poly defeated Eastern Illinois in the championship game, 21–13, to win their first Division II national title.

Conference changes and new programs
Three Division II programs upgraded to Division I-AA prior to the season.
The Pennsylvania State Athletic Conference reclassified as a Division II conference; all 14 members made the transition.

Conference standings

Conference summaries

Postseason

The 1980 NCAA Division II Football Championship playoffs were the eighth single-elimination tournament to determine the national champion of men's NCAA Division II college football. The championship game was held at University Stadium in Albuquerque, NM for the second, and final, time.

Playoff bracket

See also
1980 NCAA Division I-A football season
1980 NCAA Division I-AA football season
1980 NCAA Division III football season
1980 NAIA Division I football season
1980 NAIA Division II football season

References